Nebria chelmosensis is a species of black coloured ground beetle from Nebriinae subfamily that can be found in Japan, North and South Korea, as well as in Jiangsu province of China.

References

chinensis
Beetles described in 1872
Beetles of Asia